Fortress Round My Heart is the debut album by Norwegian musician Ida Maria, released in the UK on July 28, 2008, and in the US on March 24, 2009. Six singles were released before the album's release: "Oh My God", "Drive Away My Heart", "Stella", "Queen of the World", "I Like You So Much Better When You're Naked" and the re-release of "Oh My God".

Track listing
The original version was released through SonyBMG, as they had signed a partnership deal with Norway's Waterfall Records, who signed Ida and her independent label, Nesna Records. All songs composed by Ida Maria Sivertsen.

All songs written by Ida Maria

 "Oh My God" – 3:18
 "Drive Away My Heart" – 3:21
 "Louie" – 2:27
 "I Like You So Much Better When You're Naked" – 3:14
 "Keep Me Warm" – 3:30
 "Forgive Me" – 3:14
 "Stella" – 3:03
 "Morning Light" – 2:25
 "Queen of the World" – 3:29
 "See Me Through" – 3:24

Deluxe edition
On February 9, 2009 a deluxe edition of the album was released, after the re-release of "Oh My God". It features three new tracks, the removal of one song ("See Me Through"), a change in the order of the songs, new artwork and two bonus videos exclusive to iTunes. The album was released independently, through Nesna Records and Waterfall Records, as the deal with SonyBMG had been terminated.
Track listing
 "Oh My God"
 "Morning Light"
 "Queen of the World"
 "Stella"
 "Forgive Me"
 "Leave Me, Let Me Go" (New)
 "I Like You So Much Better When You're Naked"
 "Louie"
 "Drive Away My Heart"
 "Keep Me Warm"
 "In the End" (New)
 "We're All Going to Hell" (New)
 "I Like You So Much Better When You're Naked" Video (iTunes bonus track)
 "Oh My God" Video (iTunes bonus track)

US Edition
Mercury Records, an imprint of Island/Def Jam, released "Fortress 'Round My Heart" on digital download services on 24 March 2009. The album features 9 of the 10 tracks of the original release but with a completely rearranged track listing and new artwork again. It replaces the last song with 'In the End' from the deluxe edition.
All songs composed by Ida Maria Sivertsen.

 Oh My God
 Morning Light
 I Like You So Much Better When You're Naked
 Stella
 Keep Me Warm
 Forgive Me
 Queen Of The World
 Louie
 Drive Away My Heart
 In The End

Chart performance
The album debuted on the U.K. chart at #39, (which became its peak position).  The following week, it fell out of the top 40, from #39 to #60.

In Norway, it debuted at #5 (which became its peak position). It remained in the top 20 for seven weeks.

In Ireland, it debuted at #38.

The NME rated it as the 48th best album of the year for 2008.

Singles

Charts

Standard edition

Personnel
Ida Maria – vocals, rhythm guitar
Stefan Törnby – lead guitar
Johannes Lindberg – bass guitar
Olle Lundin – drums

References

2008 debut albums
Ida Maria albums